Yuriy Ivanovych Hulyayev (born 25 August 1963) is a retired Ukrainian professional footballer. He made his professional debut in the Soviet First League in 1982 for SC Tavriya Simferopol.

In 1983 Hulyayev took part in the Summer Spartakiad of the Peoples of the USSR in the team of Ukrainian SSR.

Honours
 Soviet Cup finalist: 1986.

References

External links
 
 

1963 births
Living people
People from Buy, Kostroma Oblast
Soviet footballers
Ukrainian footballers
Soviet Top League players
SC Tavriya Simferopol players
FC Shakhtar Donetsk players
FC Lokomotiv Nizhny Novgorod players
Russian Premier League players
FC Torpedo NN Nizhny Novgorod players
FC Sibir Novosibirsk players
FC Druzhba Berdiansk players
Ukrainian football managers
FC Shakhtar-3 Donetsk managers
Association football midfielders
Association football defenders
Ukrainian expatriate footballers
Expatriate footballers in Hungary
Ukrainian expatriate sportspeople in Hungary
Kiskőrösi FC footballers
Sportspeople from Kostroma Oblast